Dhir Shumsher Kunwar (1828 – 1884 Kathmandu) after 1848 known as Dhir Shumsher Kunwar Ranaji  or Dhir Shumsher Jang Kunwar Ranaji or shortly Dhir Shumsher Rana posthumously known as Dhir Shumsher Jang Bahadur Rana was a Nepalese politician, army general and minister of state. He served as the Commander-In-Chief of the Nepalese Army from 1879 to 1884 A.D. He was born in Kunwar family as the youngest son of Kaji Bal Narsingh Kunwar and Ganesh Kumari Thapa, daughter of Kaji Nain Singh Thapa of Thapa dynasty. Dhir Shumsher was the youngest brother of Jang Bahadur Kunwar Ranaji, who rose to premiership of Nepal after the murders of influential persons - Mathabarsingh Thapa and Gagan Singh Bhandari and the incidence of Kot Massacre. Dhir was personally involved in the massacre protecting his nearly slaughtered brother Krishna Bahadur Kunwar Rana. Dhir became military Colonel after the incident. He was in the entourage of Jung Bahadur's visit of Europe in the early 1850s.

Dhir Shumsher led the Nepalese Army in the two victorious campaigns i.e. Nepalese-Tibetan War in 1855-1856 and in the Indian Mutiny of 1857. He consolidated greater power when his elder brother Commander-in-Chief Jagat Shamsher Kunwar Rana died in 1879 CE. Onwards, he became the Commander-In-Chief of the Nepalese Army and was the stronghold behind the premiership of Shri Tin Maharaja Ranodip Singh Bahadur Kunwar Rana. He protected the premiership of his brother from a coup attempt by Jagat Jung Rana, eldest son of Jang Bahadur and Crown Prince Trailokya of Nepal in 1881-82 known as "38 Saalko Parva". His presence prevented the clash of his 17 sons against the sons of Jung Bahadur. His death in 1884 paved way for the consolidation of power by his 17 sons (Shamsher Ranas) through the murder of Premier Ranodip Singh Kunwar.

Early life

He was born circa 1828 in the Kunwar family as the youngest son of Kaji Bal Narsingh Kunwar and Ganesh Kumari Thapa, daughter of Kaji Nain Singh Thapa and Rana Kumari Pande. His brothers from Ganesh Kumari were – Jang Bahadur, Bam Bahadur, Badri Narsingh, Krishna Bahadur, Ranodip Singh and Jagat Shamsher. His step brothers include – Bhakta Bir and Jaya Bahadur. He was known as "Sannani" in his family.

Life

Kot Massacre and Europe visit

Jung Bahadur Kunwar and his brothers massacred around 29 nobles in the Kot Massacre and consolidated the key administrative posts. Dhir Shumsher, the youngest brother of Jang Bahadur was crucial in the Kot Massacre, when he struck Khadga Vikram, who had attempted to attack one of his brothers, Krishna Bahadur Kunwar Rana. He received the military rank of colonel on the subsequent day of Kot Massacre. He accompanied his eldest brother Prime Minister Jang Bahadur Rana in the 1851 Europe visit. He experienced new social entertainments during the tour of England. In one of the organized wrestling matches, Dhir defeated an English wrestling Champion. In his Paris tour, he received minor injuries  when he was struck by a bullet from a young girl who misfired a shot from Jang Bahadur's pistol.

In the Vikram year 1910 (1853 A.D.), General Dhir Shumsher occupied the sixth position in the government among the members of the Rana family, and his yearly emoluments amounted to NPR 21,853.00.

1855-56 Tibetan War

Government of Nepal declared war on Tibet on the grounds of mistreatment of Nepalese Newari traders and Nepalese representative (Nayak) in Lhasa, and Nepalese mission to Peking. The Kuti front was led by General Dhir Shumsher with 4678 troops under his control. On 3 April 1855, General Dhir Shumsher defeated a small Tibetan forces at Chusan and captured the Kuti front and further advanced to Suna Gompa. His victory at Kuti front was described by Jung Bahadur as:

He built a logistics base in Duguna village near Listi in Nepal at the border. He led an attack on the fortress of Sona Gompa which had 8000 troops. The battle was fought with great difficulty on both sides and eventually, Tibetans retreated. The Nepalese forces faced heavily damage in Kuti by the surprise assault and the forces retreated to the border. In December 1855, Dhir Shumsher recaptured Kuti with the reinforcements sent by Jung Bahadur through a multi-directional assault on the Tibetan forces. He burned the town of Kuti before returning to Listi in Nepal. Later, Dhir Shumsher estimated to British Resident C.E.R. Girdlestone that a campaign in Tibet would cost NRs. 60 lakhs more than Nepal could hope to receive compensation and indemnification from Lhasa.

Indian Mutiny

Dhir Shumsher was ordered Jang Bahadur to command 3000 Nepalese troops to Lucknow, Benaras and Patna in order to suppress Indian Mutiny of 1857. The Gorkhali forces restored the British authority in Lucknow and Gorakhpur and also succeeded in Bihar, Azampur, Jaunpur, Allahabad and Oudh.  However, Dhir Shumsher had anti-British policy and he opposed Jang Bahadur's move to support British in the Indian Mutiny.

Middle Years
According to the roll of succession of Ranas framed by Jang Bahadur on 10 Sudi Magh, 1924 V.S. (3 February 1868), Dhir was fourth in the position to the Prime Minister and was Commanding-General of the Eastern Command of Nepal Army.  In 1871, Commanding-General Dhir Shumsher received wastelands in the Eastern hill region between Dudhkoshi river and Mechi River for the cultivation of tea.

Trials in Dharmakachari
Dharmakachari, the anti-corruption court, held Ranoddip Singh and Jagat Shamsher guilty of taking bribes. But no charge was proved against Dhir Shumsher.

Family feuds and coup attempts

Jang Bahadur died on Falgun 1933 V.S. (March 1877) at Rautahat. Dhir Shumsher circulated a rumour that Jang Bahadur was critically ill, upon which the Crown Prince Trailokya of Nepal and Jang Bahadur's sons rushed to Patharghatta. Dhir attended the funeral of Jang Bahadur with the Crown Prince Trailokya with whom he had quarreled throughout the way. On their absence in Kathmandu, he immediately imposed King Surendra of Nepal to declare Ranodip Singh Kunwar as Prime Minister of Nepal. Through this move, he destroyed the plot of Jang Bahadur's eldest son Jagat Jang and Crown Prince Trailokya's motive to force King Surendra to abdicate the throne and appoint Jagat Jang as the Prime Minister. When Prince Trailokya came back to Kathmandu after the funeral, he attempted to overthrow Dhir Shumsher from political scenario with the assistance of Jagat Jang Rana, the son of deceased Jang Bahadur.

When Commander-in-Chief Jagat Shamsher Kunwar Rana died in 1879, Dhir Shumsher succeeded him in the position. Dhir Shumsher did not want to transfer his current position of Senior Commanding-General of Western Commanding forces to Jagat Jang because the forces under Western Command were huge. This event further incensed the relationship of Dhir Shumsher with his nephew Jagat Jang. Shrivikram Singh Thapa, Sangramasur Bisht and a faction of Bharadars attempted twice in the year 1938 Vikram Samvat (1881-1882 CE) to destroy both Ranodip Singh Kunwar (Prime Minister of Nepal) and Commander-In-Chief Dhir Shumsher Rana. Both attempts were aborted, and for the third attempt, the date of execution was fixed on last day of Poush (December 14, 1881). In December 1881, Prime Minister Ranodip Singh went on a hunting trip to Terai. The conspirating faction sought the assistance of Lieutenant Uttardhwaj who had ancestral rivalry with the Shrivikram Singh, a member of the conspirator group. Due to the rivalry, Lt. Uttardhwaj revealed the plot to Dhir Shumsher who was in Kathmandu. Dhir Shumsher immediately informed his brother Prime Minister Ranodip Singh Kunwar in Terai camp to arrest the conspirators in his entourage. Also, Dhir Shumsher arrested conspirators in Kathmandu on Magh Badi 2, 1938 Vikram Samvat with the help of Bam Bikram, a member of the conspiracy group. On the same night, the conspirators in the camp of Ranodip Singh were arrested and brought to Kathmandu. On Magh Badi 4, 1938 V.S. (January 1882), one of the conspirators, Subedar Simha Jang Pande took committed suicide by poison on the banks of Bagmati river at Teku while Sangramsur Bisht and Amrit Simha Adhikari revealed the conspiracy where Crown Prince Trailokya and Prince Narendra were involved. Jagat Jung and Bambir Bikram were removed out of role of succession of Ranas. Former Prime Minister Mathabarsingh Thapa's two sons – Colonel Bikram Singh Thapa and Colonel Amar Singh Thapa were also convicted aloongwith Colonel Indra Singh Shripali Tandon, Dhir Man Singh Basnyat and Kulman Singh Basnyat. A lot of nobles and courtiers were beheaded, imprisoned and degraded from their caste after the Prime Minister Ranodip Singh returned on Magh Badi 11, 1938.

Administration

Historians John Whelpton, Ishwari Prasad contended that Dhir Shumsher was the main support to the administration of Prime Minister Ranodip Singh Kunwar. Historian Perceval Landon described him as Chief Executive of Nepal when he was appointed as Commander-in-Chief. Until his death in 1884, Dhir Shumsher controlled the real authority as Ranodip Singh had an ill health and was a fragile ruler. Ranodip Singh did not act anything contrary to Dhir Shumsher and always contended him. Similarly, Dhir did not allow the British authorities to receive any Gorkhali recruits from Nepal while Ranodip Singh favoured it. His death allowed Ranodip Singh to permit Gorkhali recruitment in British Army.

As a Commanding General, Dhir Shumsher directed Subba Jayashankar Pande with the reduction of land taxes in Dang on Baisakh Badi 2, 1936 (Vikrama). On Ashadh Badi 10, 1938 (Vikrama), he also redirected Subba Pande to collect land taxes of the occupied wastelands in the region.
{{refn|group=note|
From Commanding-General Dhir Shumsher Jung Bahadur,
To Subba Jayashankar Pande.

You have submitted the following proposal: Unirrigable lands in Tuhi, Babaipar, and other areas of Dang, are lying waste because of the depredations of tigers, bears, and wild boar. Ryots have removed rocks and boulders from these lands and reclaimed them. If the tax on such lands is fixed on a contractual basis at Rs 2½ per plow, it would be collected easily, and settlement would be promoted there. Otherwise, the ryots will continue occupying these lands, and no revenue will be collected from them.

We hereby approve this proposal. We also direct that new ryots should not be made liable to make the same payments as these cultivating old lands.Ashadh Badi 10, 1938 (Vikrama).}} He also reinstated the mail services at Chitwan executed from the orders of Kartik Badi 9, 1939 Vikrama (October 1882).

Allowances
As a Commander-in-Chief, Dhir Shumsher received an annual allowance of NRs 16,000.

Family & Personal Life
He had five wives. He married a sister of Lalit Man Singh Basnet, Nanda Kumari Thapa (sister of Keshar Singh Thapa) and Juhar Kumari Devi of a noble Rajput family of Kangra.

Sons

He had 17 sons and 17 daughters. The seventeen sons of Dhir Shumsher were known as Shamsher faction, Satra Bhai ('seventeen brothers'),  or the Shamsher Rana dynasty. They began to append the name and title of Jang Bahadur Rana to their own name. They became influential with five of them being Commander-in-chief of the Nepalese Army Prime Minister of Nepal and Maharaja of Kaski and Lamjung in continuous succession between 1885 and 1945. Similarly, only two grandsons of Dhir Shumsher became the Maharaja of Kaski and Lamjung.  Many historians contend that the Shumsher Ranas were responsible for the dark period in the history of Nepal. Among the seventeen sons, only nine were high caste Ranas (A or B) while remaining eight were C Class Ranas who were born out of mistresses and ritually low caste women. The list of seventeen sons of Dhir Shumsher are:
 Bir Shamsher Jang Bahadur Rana (by sister of Lalit Man Singh Basnet) (Prime Minister of Nepal)
 Khadga Shamsher Jang Bahadur Rana (by Nanda Kumari Thapa) (Commander-in-chief of the Nepalese Army)
 Rana Shumsher Jung Bahadur Rana  (Commander-in-chief of the Nepalese Army)
 Dev Shamsher Jang Bahadur Rana (by Nanda Kumari Thapa) (Prime Minister of Nepal)
 Chandra Shamsher Jang Bahadur Rana (by Nanda Kumari Thapa) (Prime Minister of Nepal)
 Bhim Shamsher Jung Bahadur Rana (by Nanda Kumari Thapa) (Prime Minister of Nepal)
 Fatte Shamsher Jung Bahadur Rana 
 Lalit Shamsher Jung Bahadur Rana 
 Jit Shamsher Jung Bahadur Rana 
 Juddha Shamsher Jung Bahadur Rana (by Juhar Kumari Devi, a Rajput wife from Kangra) (Prime Minister of Nepal)
 Dambar Shamsher Jung Bahadur Rana
 Jadu Shamsher Jung Bahadur Rana 
 Purna Shamsher Jung Bahadur Rana 
 Durga Shamsher Jung Bahadur Rana 
 Shere Shamsher Jung Bahadur Rana 
 Khamba Shamsher Jung Bahadur Rana 
 Harka Shamsher Jung Bahadur Rana

Among the Shamsher factions, families of Chandra Shamsher and Juddha Shamsher were mostly A Class and later they removed all B and C Class Ranas from power in March 1934.

Daughters
One of daughter of Dhir Shumsher, Princess Khadga Divyeshwari Devi was married to Chautariya'' Lakshmi Narayan Shah of Salyan. In Vikrama 1966, she received a house on inheritable Bakas-Birta tenure from King Prithvi Bir Bikram Shah Dev.

Personality
 Indian Historian Ishwari Prasad opines that Dhir Shumsher "…possessed the qualities of a soldier and a statesman and was fully acquainted with the condition of Nepal." Laurence Oliphant who met Jang Bahadur and Dhir Shumsher at Ceylon in their return journey from Europe wrote following about Dhir: Historian Ishwari Prasad writes about: Writer Madhvi Yashin described Dhir as "…a man of blood and iron." Similarly, Writer Charles Allen also described Dhir as "… both a hard-bitten warrior and a statesman." He further contends that Dhir "…He effectively ruled Nepal in his brother’s name and through a series of succession passed to his own male line."

Memorials
An equestrian statue of Dhir Shumsher was constructed at the middle of Tundikhel.

Death and Aftermath
Dhir Shumsher did not manage the roll of succession to favour his eldest son Bir Shamsher Dhir Shumsher died on 14 October 1884. His death cleared way for his sons to overpower their cousins and conduct the 1885 Shamsher coup where Prime Minister Ranodip Singh Kunwar and Jung Bahadur's eldest son Jagat Jung was killed as all faction of Ranas knew that Jagat Jung would murder and destroy Shamsher family if he succeeds the uncle Maharaja Ranodip Singh Kunwar. By the coup of 1885, Shamsher brothers established the "rule of seventeen brothers" and a new era in Nepal.

Ancestry

Gallery

Sources

Footnotes

Notes

Books

Further reading

External links

1884 deaths
Nepalese politicians
Rana regime
People from Gorkha District
1828 births
Rana dynasty
Nepalese Hindus
Nepalese generals
History of Nepal
People of the Indian Rebellion of 1857
Recipients of the Kaisar-i-Hind Medal
19th-century Nepalese nobility
Khas people